The Holy Qurbana is the Eucharist as celebrated in the Edessan Rite (East Syriac Rite).

Holy Qurbana may also refer to:
 Holy Qurobo, the Eucharist as celebrated in the Indian Churches that employ the Syro-Antiochene Rite (West Syriac Rite)
 Liturgy of Addai and Mari or Holy Qurbana of Mar Addai and Mar Mari, the eucharistic liturgy in the Edessan Rite

See also
 Eucharist, a Christian rite that is considered a sacrament
 Divine Liturgy, the Eucharistic service of the Byzantine Rite
 Mass (liturgy), the Eucharistic service of the Roman Rite